This article details standard incentives given to Olympic athletes for winning a medal either by their National Olympic Committee, the government of their country/territory, or both.

While the International Olympic Committee itself don't provide monetary rewards to Olympic medalists, some countries provide prize money to athletes for winning a medal in the Olympics. Countries like Singapore and India, sports have heavy government involvement and athletes are given high monetary reward for winning an Olympic medal as a means to promote the growth of sporting culture in those countries.

According to Forbes, only Great Britain, New Zealand, Norway and Sweden don't provide monetary incentives for their athletes winning an Olympic medal (as of the 2020 Summer Olympics).

Incentives by Country (USD equivalent in 2021)

Per country

Singapore
The Singapore National Olympic Council in the 1990s under President Yeo Ning Hong instituted the Multi-Million Dollar Award Programme (MAP), an incentive scheme to reward athletes who win medals in major international tournaments, including the Olympics, for Singapore. The programme's name was changed to Major Games Award Programme (MAP) in 2018.

The largest prize money under the MAP is for athletes who clinch an Olympic gold medal. For athletes who win multiple Olympic gold medals, they entitled S$1 million only for the first individual gold medal won at the Games.

The money, however, is taxable and the medal winner is obligated to make a donation back into the sport they are representing.

Philippines
Coaches who are Filipino citizens who personally trained winning Filipino Olympians are also entitled to prize money 50% of the cash incentives for gold, silver, and bronze medalists.

References

Olympic medals
Olympic Games